Yolocaq (also, Yëlodzhag and Yëlodzhak) is a village and municipality in the Yardymli Rayon of Azerbaijan.  It has a population of 1,131.

References 

Populated places in Yardimli District